Erhan "Pitbull Attack" Deniz (born July 28, 1985, in Pendik, Istanbul) is a Turkish heavyweight kickboxer, who fights out of Mejiro Gym (Amsterdam) and Global Gym (Istanbul). His nickname comes from his passion on pit bull dogs.

Career
Deniz began training in boxing at 10 years old before switching to Muay Thai. He has been to Thailand several times with the Turkish national team for season camps.

He first came to prominence when he won the Pro Tournament Ring Masters, a four-man tournament held at the Haldun Alagas Sport Hall in Umraniye, Istanbul on May 25, 2007. He defeated Hasan Gul in the semi-finals and then Eyup Kuscu in the final to become the Heavyweight Champion of Turkey.

He made his debut with the K-1 promotion in August 2007 at the K-1 World Grand Prix 2007 in Hong Kong, where he defeated South Korean ssireum fighter Kim Dong-Wook in a reserve match for the 8-man Grand Prix taking part on that night. On November 2, 2007, Deniz took part in the Grand Prix at K-1 Fighting Network Turkey 2007 but was defeated by Brazil's Vitor Miranda at the quarter-final stage.

On June 11, 2011, he made his It's Showtime debut against the Romanian Daniel Ghiță in the main event at BFN Group presents: It's Showtime Warsaw and lost via knockout in the second round due to a body shot.

Personal life
On September 16, 2010, he married Nurhayat Hiçyakmazer, a Turkish world and European champion in several martial arts disciplines. He was her former trainer.

Titles
2011 SuperKombat World Grand Prix IV champion
2011 I.F.M.A European Muaythai Championships in Antalya, Turkey  +91 kg
2007 Pro Tournament Ring Masters champion

Kickboxing record

|-
|
|  Win
| Tomasz Czerwinski
|World Thai Boxing Champions Night II
|Istanbul, Turkey
| TKO (3 Counts)
|align="center"|1
|align="center"|
| 
|-
|
|Win
|  Maikel Leimbereger
|Championship Night
|Istanbul, Turkey
|Decision
|align="center"|3
|align="center"|3:00
| 
|-
|
|Win
|  Christos Soulas
|No Limit 8
|Sarajevo, Bosnia and Herzegovina
|Decision (Unanimous)
|align="center"|3
|align="center"|3:00
|
|-
|
|Loss
| Sergei Lascenko
|SuperKombat World Grand Prix Final 2011
|Darmstadt, Germany
|TKO (doctor stoppage)
|align="center"|3
|align="center"|0:53
|SuperKombat World Grand Prix Final semi-final.
|-
|
|Win
| Wendell Roche
|SuperKombat World Grand Prix IV 2011
|Piatra Neamț, Romania
|Decision (unanimous)
|align="center"|3
|align="center"|3:00
|SuperKombat World Grand Prix IV final.
|-
|
|Win
| Angelis Konstantinos
|SuperKombat World Grand Prix IV 2011
|Piatra Neamț, Romania
|KO (punches)
|align="center"|2
|align="center"|1:58
|SuperKombat World Grand Prix IV semi-final.
|-
|
|Loss
| Daniel Ghiță
|BFN Group presents: It's Showtime Warsaw
|Warsaw, Poland
|KO (left hook to the body)
|align="center"|2
|align="center"|2:50
| 
|-
|
|Loss
| Tomáš Hron
|Gala night Thaiboxing
|Zilina, Slovakia
|Decision
|align="center"|3
|align="center"|3:00
| 
|-
|
|Win
| Sebastian Ciobanu
|Sarajevo Fight Night 2
|Sarajevo, Bosnia and Herzegovina
|Decision
|align="center"|3
|align="center"|3:00
| 
|-
|
|Loss
| Slavo Polugić
|Ergen Ring Ateşi 13
|Van, Turkey
|Decision
|align="center"|5
|align="center"|3:00
|Fight was for WKN World Championship -96,600 kg.
|-
|-
|
|Win
| Petyr Vylkov
|Ergen Ring Ateşi 
|Komotini, Greece
|Decision
|align="center"|3
|align="center"|3:00
| 
|-
|
|Loss
| Mourad Bouzidi
|Ring Sensation Championships: Uprising 12
|Rotterdam, Netherlands
|Decision (unanimous)
|align="center"|3
|align="center"|3:00
| 
|-
|
|Loss
| Freddy Kemayo
|TK2 World MAX 2009
|Aix-en-Provence, France
|TKO (referee stoppage/broken nose)
|align="center"|3
|align="center"|-
| 
|-
|
|Loss
| Bahadir Sari
| 
|Istanbul, Turkey
|Decision
|align="center"|5
|align="center"|3:00
|For ISKA Oriental Rules Heavyweight Turkish Title.
|-
|
|Win
| Cafer Ahmedi
|Ergen Ring Ateşi 4
|Turkey
| 
|align="center"|
|align="center"|
|
|-
|-
|
|Win
| Dennis Sebastian
|Ergen Ring Attest 2
|Istanbul, Turkey
|Decision
|align="center"|3
|align="center"|3:00
|
|-
|-
|
|Loss
| Sergei Lascenko
|4th Busan TAFISA World Games
|Busan, South Korea
|TKO (referee stoppage)
|align="center"|3
|align="center"|-
| 
|-
|
|Loss
| Doug Viney
|K-1 Slovakia 2008
|Bratislava, Slovakia
|Decision (unanimous)
|align="center"|3
|align="center"|3:00
| 
|-
|
|Loss
| Cătălin Moroșanu
|K-1 World Grand Prix 2008 in Budapest Europe GP Final Elimination
|Budapest, Hungary
|Extra round decision (unanimous)
|align="center"|4
|align="center"|3:00
| 
|-
|
|Loss
| Vitor Miranda
|K-1 Fighting Network Turkey 2007
|Istanbul, Turkey
|Decision (majority)
|align="center"|3
|align="center"|3:00
|2007 Turkey Grand Prix quarter-final.
|-
|
|Loss
| Azem Maksutaj
| 
|Bratislava, Slovakia
|Decision
|align="center"|3
|align="center"|3:00
| 
|-
|
|Win
| Kim Dong-Wook
|K-1 World Grand Prix 2007 in Hong Kong
|Hong Kong
|KO (low kicks)
|align="center"|2
|align="center"|0:23
| 
|-
|
|Win
| Eyüp Kuşçu
|Pro Tournament Ring Masters
|Istanbul, Turkey
| -
|align="center"|-
|align="center"|-
|Ring Masters Tournament final.
|-
|
|Win
| Hasan Gül
|Pro Tournament Ring Masters
|Istanbul, Turkey
| TKO (right high kick)
|align="center"|2
|align="center"|-
|Ring Masters Tournament semi-final.
|-
|-
| colspan=9 | Legend:

See also
List of K-1 events
List of male kickboxers
Muay Thai

References

External links
K-1 World Grand Prix 2007 in Hong Kong, K-1 Official website
Ring Masters Tournament Schedule in Turkish

1985 births
Living people
Turkish male kickboxers
Heavyweight kickboxers
Turkish Muay Thai practitioners
Turkish expatriate sportspeople in the Netherlands
Sportspeople from Istanbul
SUPERKOMBAT kickboxers